Kulishovka is a rural locality (a settlement) in Novokharkovskoye Rural Settlement, Olkhovatsky District, Voronezh Oblast, Russia. The population was 83 as of 2010.

Geography 
Kulishovka is located 9 km north of Olkhovatka (the district's administrative centre) by road. Kulishovka is the nearest rural locality.

References 

Rural localities in Olkhovatsky District